A train driver, engine driver, engineman or locomotive driver, commonly known as an engineer or railroad engineer  in the United States and Canada, and also as a locomotive handler, locomotive engineer, locomotive operator, train operator, or motorman, is a person who operates a train, railcar, or other rail transport vehicle. The driver is in charge of and is responsible for the mechanical operation of the train, train speed, and all of the train handling (also known as brake handling). In American English, a hostler (also known as a switcher) moves engines around rail yards, but does not take them out on the main line tracks; the British English equivalent is a shunter.

Train drivers must follow certain guidelines for driving a train safely. For instance, in general, train drivers are encouraged to favour longer stopping distances as this promotes vehicle health, safety, and passenger comfort.

Career progression 
For many American railroads, the following career progression is typical: assistant conductor (brakeman), train conductor, and finally the engineer. For many years the fireman was next in line to be an engineer, but that classification has been eliminated. In the US, engineers are required to be certified and must then be re-certified every two to three years.

The traditional career progression in the United Kingdom (for steam locomotives) was engine cleaner, passed engine cleaner (i.e. the employee has passed the assessment for fireman), fireman, passed fireman (i.e. passed assessment for driver), and driver.

In India, a driver starts as a diesel assistant (or electrical assistant for electric locomotives). They then get promoted on a scale: goods, passenger, mail express, and the Rajdhani, Shatabdi, and Duronto express services.

The British transport historian Christian Wolmar wrote in October 2013 that train operators employed by the Rio Tinto Group to transport iron ore across the Australian outback were likely to be the highest-paid members of the occupation in the world at that time.

Notable train drivers 

 Ben Chifley, former Prime Minister of Australia
 Christine Gonzalez, first female driver for a Class 1 railroad.
 Casey Jones, American engineer whose wreck on the Illinois Central Railroad on April 30, 1900 was immortalized in verse and music.

See also 
 Conductor
 Fireman
 Motorman
 Secondman

Notes

References

Further reading 
 
 
 
 

The following examine the role of the railroad engineer from 1890 to 1919, discussing qualifications for becoming an engineer and typical experiences on the job:
 
 
Wilson David C Forward! The Revolution in the Lives of the Footplatemen 1962–1996 Published by Suttons ISBN 0-7509-1144-1

External links 

 TrainDriver.org – A detailed explanation of what train driving involves, and becoming a train driver in the UK

 
Driver